Bernardo Sabadini (also known as Sabatini) (died November 26, 1718) was an Italian opera composer.  He may have been a native of Venice.  A number of his operas appear to have been revisions of works by other composers to an unknown extent.  He died at Parma.

Operas
Furio Camillo (1686) 
Didio Giuliano (1687) 
Zenone il tiranno (1687) 
Olimpia placata (1687) 
L'Ercole trionfante (1688)
Teseo in Atene (1688)
Hierone tiranno di Siracusa (1688) 
Amor spesso inganna (1689)
Teodora clemente (1689)
Il Vespesiano (1689)
La gloria d'Amore (1690) 
Il favore degli dei (1690) 
Pompeo continente (1690) 
Diomede punito da Alcide (1691) 
La pace fra Tolomeo e Seleuco (1691)
Circe abbandonata da Ulisse (1692) 
Il Massimino (1692)
Talestri innamorata d'Alessandro Magno (1693) 
Il riso nato fra il pianto (1694) 
Demetrio tiranno (1694) 
L'Orfeo (1694)
La virtů trionfante dell'inganno (1697)
L'Aiace (1697)
L'Eusonia, overo La dama stravagante (1697)
L'Alarico (1698)
Il Domizio (1698)
Il Ruggiero (1699) 
L'Eraclea (1700)
Il Meleagro (1705)
Alessandro amante eroe (1706) 
Annibale (1706) 
La virtů coronata, o sia Il Fernando (1714)

References
OperaGlass page (cached)
[Complete Score of L' Ercole Trionfante by D. B. Sabadini/ G.A. Boretti/ A. Aureli based on the Piacenza 1688 Libretto in : "Civiltà Musicale Farnesiana"-IInd issue, 2021, 840 pp.]

External links
 

Year of birth unknown
1718 deaths
18th-century Italian male musicians
Italian Baroque composers
Italian male classical composers
Italian opera composers
Male opera composers
Musicians from Venice
18th-century Italian composers